Vilacirca (possibly from Aymara wila blood, blood-red, sirka vein of the body or a mine, "red vein") is mountain in the northern extensions of the Vilcanota mountain range in the Andes of Peru, about  high. It is located in the Cusco Region, Quispicanchi Province,  Ocongate District. Vilacirca lies south of Jolljepunco where the annual Quyllur Rit'i festival takes place.

References 

Mountains of Cusco Region
Mountains of Peru